Samuel Leo Beat Ballet (born 12 March 2001) is a Swiss professional footballer who plays as a forward for FC Winterthur, on loan from Young Boys.

Club career
Ballet made his professional debut on 16 February 2020 against Lugano, replacing Saidy Janko. He scored an 89th minute game-winner in the eventual 2–1 victory.

International career
Ballet was born in Switzerland to a Swiss father and Cameroonian mother. He is a youth international for Switzerland.

References

External links
 

2001 births
Living people
Footballers from Bern
Swiss men's footballers
Switzerland youth international footballers
Swiss people of Cameroonian descent
Swiss sportspeople of African descent
Association football forwards
Swiss Super League players
Swiss 1. Liga (football) players
BSC Young Boys players
FC Winterthur players